Tracy Joanne Borman (born 1 January 1972) is a historian and author from Scothern, Lincolnshire, England. She is most widely known as the author of Elizabeth's Women, a portrait-gallery of the powerful women who influenced Queen Elizabeth I.

In July 2022 Borman was made Chancellor of Bishop Grosseteste University in Lincoln.

Early life and education 
Borman was born in 1972 in Lincoln and brought up in nearby the village of Scothern. She was educated at Scothern Primary School (now Ellison Boulters Academy), William Farr School, Welton, and Yarborough School (now Lincoln Castle Academy), Lincoln. She studied and taught history at the University of Hull, where she was awarded a PhD in 1997.

Career
Elizabeth's Women was serialised and became a BBC Radio 4 Book of the Week in September 2009. Borman appeared on BBC Radio 4's Woman's Hour, also in September 2009.

In 2013, she was appointed Joint Chief Curator of Historic Royal Palaces alongside Lucy Worsley.

Personal life
She and her husband, whom she married at the Tower of London, live in New Malden, south-west London.

Published works

Fiction
The King's Witch (2018)
The Devil's Slave (2019)
 The Fallen Angel (2020)

Non-fiction
 Henrietta Howard: King's Mistress, Queen's Servant, Jonathan Cape and Vintage (2007)
 Elizabeth's Women: The Hidden Story of the Virgin Queen, Jonathan Cape and Vintage (2010)
 Matilda: Queen of the Conqueror, Jonathan Cape and Vintage (2011)
 The Ring and the Crown: A History of Royal Weddings 1066–2011 (with Alison Weir, Kate Williams and Sarah Gristwood) (2011) 
 Witches: A Tale of Sorcery, Scandal and Seduction, Jonathan Cape and Vintage (2013)
 The Story of the Tower of London, Merrell
 Thomas Cromwell: The Hidden Story of Henry VIII's Most Faithful Servant. Hodder and Stoughton (2015)
 The Private Lives of the Tudors: Uncovering the Secrets of Britain's Greatest Dynasty, Hodder and Stoughton (2016)
 Henry VIII: And the Men Who Made Him, Hodder and Stoughton (2019)
 Crown and Sceptre: A New History of the British Monarchy from William the Conqueror to Elizabeth II (2021)

References

External links
 Personal website
 Biography on Royal Historic Palaces official website
 

1972 births
Living people
21st-century English women writers
21st-century English historians
Alumni of the University of Hull
British women historians
English non-fiction writers
English women non-fiction writers
English women novelists
People associated with Bishop Grosseteste University
People associated with Historic Royal Palaces
People from West Lindsey District